The Sons of the American Revolution (SAR) is a United States patriotic and lineage organization founded in 1889.  The following is a list of notable members since the organization's founding.

Heads of State

Presidents of the United States
To date, 17 presidents of the United States have been members of the SAR. President Grant was admitted posthumously in recognition of his being a member of the Sons of Revolutionary Sires, whose members were later admitted to membership in the SAR.
 Ulysses S. Grant (posthumous) 18th
 Rutherford B. Hayes 19th
 Benjamin Harrison 23rd
 William McKinley 25th
 Theodore Roosevelt 26th
 William Howard Taft 27th
 Warren G. Harding 29th
 Calvin Coolidge 30th
 Herbert Hoover 31st
 Franklin D. Roosevelt 32nd
 Harry S. Truman 33rd
 Dwight D. Eisenhower 34th
 Lyndon B. Johnson 36th
 Gerald R. "Jerry" Ford 38th
 James Earl "Jimmy" Carter 39th
 George H. W. Bush 41st
 George W. Bush 43rd

Of the presidents who lived since the SAR's founding in 1889 and are not listed above, presidents Grover Cleveland, Richard Nixon, Bill Clinton, Barack Obama all had patriot ancestors but did not join the SAR.  Presidents Woodrow Wilson, John F. Kennedy, Ronald Reagan, and Donald Trump did not have patriot ancestors .

Of the 22 presidents who served prior to the founding of the SAR, six qualify as patriot ancestors – George Washington, John Adams, Thomas Jefferson, James Madison, James Monroe and Andrew Jackson.  Two others, Grant and Hayes, were members of SAR.  Of the remaining 14, all except for Martin Van Buren had patriot ancestors.

Vice presidents of the United States
 Charles G. Dawes
 Levi P. Morton
 Nelson Rockefeller

In addition to the above, the following vice presidents were SAR compatriots and later became President of the United States:  Theodore Roosevelt, Calvin Coolidge, Harry S Truman, Lyndon Johnson, Gerald Ford and George H.W. Bush.

National leaders outside the United States
 HM Juan Carlos I – King of Spain
 HM Felipe VI of Spain – King of Spain
 Rt. Hon. Sir Winston Churchill KG, OM, CH, TD, FRS – Prime Minister of the United Kingdom

Nobel Prize recipients

Nobel Peace Prize recipients
 President Theodore Roosevelt
 President Jimmy Carter
 Vice President Charles G. Dawes
 Secretary of State Elihu Root
 Secretary of State Frank B. Kellogg

Nobel Prize for Literature recipient
 Sir Winston Churchill

Military

Medal of Honor recipients
The following 40 SAR Compatriots are known to have received the United States Congressional Medal of Honor. It is possible that there are other Medal of Honor recipients who were SAR Compatriots. The number received for each conflict is as follows: Civil War – 16, Indian Wars – 6, Spanish–American War – 3, Philippines – 2, Vera Cruz – 1, Peacetime – 3, World War II – 7, Vietnam – 2.

(The rank indicated is the highest held by the individual and not necessarily that held at the time the Medal of Honor was earned or awarded.)
 General of the Army Douglas MacArthur, USA – Legendary general (General MacArthur approved an SAR service medal, the Patriot Medal, bearing his likeness, and was the first recipient following his death in 1964.)
 General Jonathan Wainwright, USA – Commanded the defense of the Philippines.
 Admiral Frank F. Fletcher – Commander of the Vera Cruz intervention.
 Lieutenant General Nelson A. Miles, USA – U.S. Army Commanding General, 1895–1903.
 Vice Admiral James Bond Stockdale, USN – Prisoner of War in Vietnam.
 Major General Patrick Brady, USA – Vietnam War helicopter pilot.
 Major General Adolphus Greely, USA – Civil War veteran and Arctic explorer.
 Major General Theodore S. Peck, VTNG – Adjutant General of Vermont
 Major General William R. Shafter, USA – Commanded the Fifth Army Corps during the Siege of Santiago.
 Major General David S. Stanley, USV – hero of the Battle of Franklin during the Civil War.
 Brevet Major General Lewis Addison Grant, USV – Assistant Secretary of War.
 Brevet Major General Rufus Saxton, USV – Defended Harper's Ferry during the Civil War.
 Brevet Major General Orlando Willcox, USA – Wounded in action at the Battle of Bull Run.
 Rear Admiral Richard E. Byrd Jr., USN – Aviator and Antarctic explorer.
 Brigadier General Theodore Roosevelt Jr., AUS – Landed at Utah Beach on D-Day.
 Brigadier General John B. Babcock, USA – Veteran of the Civil War and the Indian Wars.
 Brigadier General Joseph Foss, SDANG – Marine fighter pilot and Governor of South Dakota.
 Brigadier General Horatio Collins King, NYNG
 Brigadier General Oscar F. Long, USA – Served in the campaign against Chief Joseph.
 Brigadier General Edmund Rice, USA – Earned the Medal of Honor at the Battle of Gettysburg.
 Brevet Brigadier General Byron Mac Cutcheon, USV – Brigade commander during the Civil War.
 Brevet Brigadier General Horace Porter, USV – President General of the SAR from 1892 to 1897.
 Brevet Brigadier General Philip S. Post, USV – Civil War veteran and U.S. Representative.
 Brevet Brigadier General Edward W. Whitaker, USV – Cavalry officer during the Civil War.
 Colonel John C. Gresham, USA
 Colonel Charles H. Heyl, USA
 Colonel Theodore Roosevelt, USV – Hero of the Battle of San Juan Hill.
 Brevet Colonel Clinton A. Cilley, USV
 Lieutenant Colonel Bernard A. Byrne, USV
 Brevet Lieutenant Colonel George G. Benedict, USV
 Major Robert Hugo Dunlap, USMC – Commanded a company of Marines at Iwo Jima.
 Major John Alexander Logan Jr., USV
 Brevet Major Ira H. Evans, USV
 Surgeon John O. Skinner, USA
 Captain George Washington Brush, USV – Commanded a company of the 34th United States Colored Troops (USCT).
 Lieutenant William Lowell Hill, USN – Rescued a sailor from drowning.
 First Lieutenant Powhatan H. Clarke, USA – Commanded African-American Cavalrymen (a.k.a. "Buffalo Soldiers") against Apache Indians.
 Chief Warrant Officer Hershel W. Williams, USMCR – Last surviving World War II Medal of Honor recipient.
 Technical Sergeant Charles H. Coolidge, USA – Infantry soldier who served in France during World War II.
 Sergeant John D. Hawk, USA – Earned the Medal of Honor at the Battle of the Falaise Pocket.

Military and naval officers
 Admiral of the Navy George Dewey – Hero of the Battle of Manila Bay
 General of the Armies Ulysses S. Grant – Commanding General of the Union Army and President of the United States
 General of the Armies John J. Pershing – U.S. Army Chief of Staff and commander of the American Expeditionary Force in the First World War
 General of the Army Dwight Eisenhower – Supreme Commander of Allied Forces Europe
 General of the Air Force Henry H. Arnold, USAF – Commander of the U.S. Army Air Force in World War II
 Fleet Admiral William F. Halsey – Commander of the 3rd Fleet in World War II
 General Joseph E. Johnston, CSA – Confederate general
 General Frederick Kroesen – Vice Chief of Staff of the United States Army
 General James N. Mattis, USMC – 26th Secretary of Defense and Commander the United States Joint Forces Command 2007 to 2010.
 General Charles P. Summerall – U.S. Army Chief of Staff and president of The Citadel
 General William C. Westmoreland – Commander of Military Assistance Command Vietnam (MACV)
 Admiral Thomas H. Moorer – Chairman of the Joint Chiefs of Staff
 Admiral David Dixon Porter – Senior admiral of the U.S. Navy from 1870 to 1891
 Admiral Harry D. Train II – NATO Supreme Allied Commander Atlantic
 Lieutenant General Simon B. Buckner, CSA – Veteran of the Civil War and Governor of Kentucky
 Lieutenant General Joseph Wheeler, CSA – Veteran of the Civil War and the Spanish–American War
 Lieutenant General Theodore G. Stroup, USA – Deputy Chief of Staff, Personnel
 Lieutenant General Guy Swan, USA – Commanding General, 5th US Army
 Lieutenant General David Ohle, USA – Deputy Chief of Staff, Personnel
 Vice Admiral James Bond Stockdale, USN – President of the Naval War College
 Major General James A. Adkins, USA – 28th Adjutant General of Maryland
 Major General Thomas M. Anderson – Veteran of the Civil War, Spanish–American War and the Philippine Insurrection
 Major General Joseph Cabell Breckinridge Sr., USV – Veteran of the Civil War and the Spanish–American War
 Major General Donald Burdick, USA – Director, Army National Guard
 Major General Darius N. Couch, USV – Union Army general during the Civil War
 Major General Frederick D. Grant, USV – Son of President Ulysses S. Grant
 Major General Ulysses S. Grant III – Grandson of President Ulysses S. Grant
 Major General Curtis Guild Jr., MVM – Governor of Massachusetts
 Major General William Henry Fitzhugh Lee, CSA – Son of General Robert E. Lee
 Major General George Owen Squier USA, – Chief Signal Officer of the United States Army in World War I, inventor of telephone carrier multiplexing in 1910 and Muzak background music
 Rear Admiral Charles Johnston Badger – Superintendent of the United States Naval Academy
 Rear Admiral John R. Bartlett – Oceanographer
 Rear Admiral George Belknap
 Rear Admiral Charles Edgar Clark – Captain of the battleship USS Oregon during the Spanish–American War
 Rear Admiral Walter S. Crosley – Navy Cross recipient
 Rear Admiral Lewis A. Kimberly
 Rear Admiral Winfield Scott Schley – Hero of the Battle of Santiago de Cuba
 Rear Admiral Yates Stirling – Veteran of the American Civil War and the Spanish–American War
 Rear Admiral John L. Worden – Commander of the USS Monitor
 Brigadier General James Devereux, USMC – Recipient of the Navy Cross and congressman
 Brigadier General Charles Wheaton Abbot Jr., RING – Adjutant General of Rhode Island
 Brigadier General George Andrews – Adjutant General of the United States Army
 Brigadier General George Lippitt Andrews
 Brigadier General William H. Bisbee – Veteran of the Civil War and Spanish–American War (lived to age 102)
 Brigadier General Charles A. Coolidge – Veteran of the Civil War and Spanish–American War.
 Brigadier General Charles Duke, USAF – Apollo 16 lunar module pilot.
 Brigadier General Elisha Dyer Jr., RIM – Adjutant General of Rhode Island
 Brigadier General Winfield Scott Edgerly – Veteran of the Indian Wars and the Spanish–American War.
 Brigadier General James Roosevelt, USMCR – Recipient of the Navy Cross and the Silver Star.
 Brigadier General George Miller Sternberg – U.S. Army Surgeon General.
 Brigadier General Charles Foster Tillinghast Sr., RING – Veteran of the Spanish–American War and World War I
 Brevet Brigadier General Edwin S. Greeley, USV – Union Veteran of the Civil War
 Commodore Oscar C. Badger, USN
 Commodore Alfred Brooks Fry, NYNM
 Captain Charles V. Gridley, USN – Captain of the USS Olympia at the Battle of Manila Bay.
 Captain Blake Wayne Van Leer, USN – Recipient of the Legion of Merit and Moreell Medal.
 Colonel William Hayward – Commander of the Harlem Hellfighters during World War I.
 Colonel Ashley Chadbourne McKinley, USAF – Photographer on first flight over the South Pole.
 Colonel Theodore Roosevelt, USV – Spanish–American War veteran and leader of the Rough Riders.
 Lieutenant Colonel John Q. Cannon, USV – Spanish-American War veteran and excommunicated Mormon leader.
 Lieutenant Colonel Russell Benjamin Harrison, USV – Veteran of the Spanish–American War and son of President Benjamin Harrison.
 Lieutenant Colonel Archibald Roosevelt, AUS – Veteran of both world wars and four time recipient of the Silver Star.
 Commander Franklin Roosevelt Jr., USN – Recipient of the Silver Star and Congressman.
 Major Washington Irving Lincoln Adams, NA – Politician, banker and veteran of World War I, descendant of President John Adams and president general of the SAR from 1922 to 1923.
 Major Archibald Butt – Presidential aide who died on the RMS Titanic.
 Major Kermit Roosevelt, AUS – Served in the British and American armies in both world wars and recipient of the Military Cross.
 Brevet Major Augustus P. Davis, USV – Founder of the Sons of Union Veterans of the Civil War.

Public officials

Cabinet officers 
 Charles F. Adams III – Secretary of the Navy
 Russell A. Alger – United States Secretary of War
 Joseph W. Barr – Secretary of the Treasury
 Herbert Hoover – Secretary of Commerce
 Charles Evans Hughes (honorary) – Supreme Court Chief Justice, Secretary of State and Governor of New York
 Frank B. Kellogg – Secretary of State
 Jim Mattis - General and United States Secretary of Defense
 Franklin Roosevelt – Assistant Secretary of the Navy
 Theodore Roosevelt – Assistant Secretary of the Navy
 Elihu Root – Secretary of War and Secretary of State
 Donald Rumsfeld – Secretary of Defense
 John Sherman – Secretary of State, Secretary of the Treasury and United States Senator, author of the Sherman Anti-Trust Act
 Henry L. Stimson – Secretary of War during World War II

Diplomats
 Angier Biddle Duke – Ambassador to Denmark
 David Jayne Hill – Ambassador to Germany
 John Langeloth Loeb Jr. – Ambassador to Denmark
 Thomas W. Palmer – Ambassador to Spain
 Horace Porter – Ambassador to France
 G. Mennen Williams – Ambassador to the Philippines
 Henry L. Wilson – Diplomat and Ambassador to Mexico 1909–1913

Governors
 Sherman Adams – Governor of New Hampshire and chief of staff to President Eisenhower
 Russell A. Alger – Governor of Michigan
 Augustus O. Bourn – Governor of Rhode Island
 Simon B. Buckner – Governor of Kentucky
 Morgan Bulkeley – Governor of Connecticut, United States Senator, Mayor of Hartford and longtime president of Aetna Insurance
 Harry F. Byrd – Governor and United States senator from Virginia
 Elias Carr – Governor of North Carolina
 Lawton Chiles – U.S. Senator and Governor of Florida
 Owen Vincent Coffin – Governor of Connecticut
 Channing H. Cox – Governor of Massachusetts
 Cushman Kellogg Davis – Governor of Minnesota
 Thomas E. Dewey – Governor of New York and presidential candidate
 Elisha Dyer Jr. – Governor of Rhode Island
 Charles Edison – Governor of New Jersey and son of Thomas Edison
 Bob Ehrlich – Governor of Maryland
 Phillips Lee Goldsborough – Governor of Maryland
 Robert S. Green – Governor of New Jersey
 Curtis Guild Jr. – Governor of Massachusetts
 Lucius F. Hubbard – Governor of Minnesota and brigadier general during the Spanish–American War
 Robert Floyd Kennon – Governor of Louisiana
 Charles D. Kimball – Governor of Rhode Island
 Charles W. Lippitt – Governor of Rhode Island
 Arch A. Moore Jr. – Governor of West Virginia
 Levi P. Morton – Vice President of the U.S. and Governor of New York
 Franklin Murphy – Governor of New Jersey
 Martin O'Malley – Governor of Maryland and presidential candidate
 Chase Osborn – Governor of Michigan
 Rick Perry – Governor of Texas
 Henry Roberts – Governor of Connecticut
 Nelson A. Rockefeller – Governor of New York and Vice President of the United States
 Winthrop Rockefeller – Governor of Arkansas
 Theodore Roosevelt – Governor of New York
 John G. Rowland – Governor of Connecticut
 Leverett Saltonstall – Governor of Massachusetts
 Royal C. Taft – Governor of Rhode Island
 Edwin Warfield – Governor of Maryland
 G. Mennen Williams – Governor of Michigan
 Charles S. Whitman – Governor of New York
 Rollin S. Woodruff – Governor of Connecticut

United States senators
 Lamar Alexander – United States senator from Tennessee
 Russell A. Alger – United States senator from Michigan
 Scott Brown – United States senator from Massachusetts
 Quentin N. Burdick – United States senator from North Dakota
 Harry F. Byrd Jr. – United States senator from Virginia
 Royal S. Copeland – United States senator from New York
 Cushman Kellogg Davis - United States senator from Minnesota
 Chauncey M. Depew – United States senator, member of the Skull and Bones Society and President of the Empire State Society of the SAR from 1890 to 1899
 Sam Ervin – United States senator and Distinguished Service Cross recipient
 William P. Frye – United States senator from Maine
 Barry M. Goldwater – United States senator from Arizona and presidential candidate
Chuck Grassley  - United States senator from Iowa and President pro tempore of the United States Senate
 Marcus A. Hanna – United States senator from New York
 Hamilton Fish Kean – United States senator from New Jersey
 Kenneth B. Keating – United States senator from New York and Ambassador to India and Israel
 Henry F. Lippitt – United States senator from Rhode Island
 Henry Cabot Lodge – United States senator from Massachusetts
 John S. McCain, III – United States senator from Arizona
 Mitch McConnell – United States senator from Kentucky and United States Senate Minority Leader
 Jesse H. Metcalf – United States senator from Rhode Island
 John Holmes Overton – United States senator from Louisiana
 Thomas W. Palmer – United States senator from Michigan
 Gary Peters – United States senator from Michigan
 Orville H. Platt – United States senator from Connecticut
 Leverett Saltonstall – United States senator and governor of Massachusetts
 Robert Taft Jr. – United States senator from Ohio
 Herman Talmadge – United States senator from Georgia
 Strom Thurmond – United States senator from South Carolina
 John Tower – United States senator from Texas
 Roger Wicker – United States senator from Mississippi

U.S. representatives
 Richard S. Aldrich – U.S. representative from Rhode Island
 Hale Boggs – Majority Leader, U.S. House of Representatives
 Colonel William Campbell Preston Breckinridge, CSA – U.S. representative from Kentucky
 Charles E. Chamberlain – U.S. representative from Michigan
 Byron M. Cutcheon – U.S. representative from Michigan
 Brigadier General James P. S. Devereux, USMC – U.S. representative and Navy Cross recipient
 Charles H. Grosvenor – U.S. representative
 Gilbert Gude – U.S. representative
 Jefferson M. Levy – U.S. representative and owner of Monticello
 John J. Rhodes – U.S. representative for 30 years
 Franklin Delano Roosevelt Jr. – U.S. representative
 Henry Stockbridge – U.S. representative
 David Jenkins Ward – U.S. representative
 Bob Wilson – U.S. representative from California

Judges
 William Howard Taft – Chief Justice of the United States
 David Josiah Brewer – Associate justice of the Supreme Court
 George E. Bushnell – Chief Justice of the Michigan Supreme Court

Other public officials
 Colonel Louis R. Cheney – Mayor of Hartford, Connecticut
 Arthur W. Coolidge – Lieutenant Governor of Massachusetts
 George P. Cronk – Los Angeles City Council member, 1945–52
 Arthur W. Dennis – Lieutenant Governor of Rhode Island
 Seymour Lowman – Lieutenant Governor of New York
 Wallace McCamant – Federal judge
 Winthrop Paul Rockefeller – Lieutenant Governor of Arkansas
 Theodore Roosevelt – Police commissioner of New York City
 Ernest E. Rogers – Lieutenant Governor of Connecticut

Other notable members
 Henry L. P. Beckwith Jr. – Genealogist and historian
 Thomas W. Bicknell – Educator and anti-segregationist
 Luther Blount – Inventor and shipyard owner
 George Madison Bodge – Author, historian, and genealogist
 John Nicholas Brown II – Philanthropist
 Charles W. Burpee – Newspaper editor
 John Q. Cannon - Excommunicated Mormon leader.
 Nick Clooney - American journalist, anchorman, and television host. He is the father of actor George Timothy Clooney
 Edward Miner Gallaudet – Founder of the Columbia Institution for the Deaf
 Henry Louis Gates, Jr – Professor and chairman of the African American Studies Program at Harvard University and television host
 Elbridge Thomas Gerry – Social reformer and commodore of the New York Yacht Club
 Benjamin Apthorp Gould – astronomer
 John B. Hattendorf – Naval historian and professor at the United States Naval War College
 William Randolph Hearst – Newspaper publisher and U.S. Representative
 William Randolph Hearst Jr. – Newspaper editor
 Benjamin Newhall Johnson – Attorney and historian
 William Ingraham Koch - American billionaire businessman, sailor, collector and 1992 winner of America's Cup
 William Osborn McDowell – Founder of the SAR
 Frederick Law Olmsted – Landscape architect and designer of Central Park
 Norman Vincent Peale – Author and minister
 H. Paul Pressler – Texas appeals court justice and leader of the Conservative Resurgence in the Southern Baptist Convention
 John D. Rockefeller – Oil refiner
 Theodore Roosevelt – Author and conservationist
 Adam Schnelting - Soldier and Missouri politician
 Elliott Fitch Shepard – lawyer and newspaper owner
 Ricky Skaggs - Country and Bluegrass Musician
 George Albert Smith – President of the Church of Jesus Christ of Latter-day Saints
 John Spencer-Churchill – Artist and nephew of Winston Churchill
 Lowell Thomas – Author and news reporter
 George Washington Vanderbilt II – Owner of the Biltmore estate
 Edgar Williamson Jr. – Insurance executive

References

Lists of people by association
Sons of the American Revolution